Seyoum Tesfaye is an Ethiopian professional footballer who plays as a defender for Ethiopian Premier League club Ethiopian Coffee.

International career
In January 2014, coach Sewnet Bishaw, invited him to be a part of the Ethiopia squad for the 2014 African Nations Championship. The team was eliminated in the group stages after losing to Congo, Libya and Ghana.

International goals
Scores and results list Ethiopia's goal tally first.

References

Living people
1989 births
Sportspeople from Oromia Region
Ethiopian footballers
Ethiopia international footballers
Association football defenders
2014 African Nations Championship players
2016 African Nations Championship players
Mekelle 70 Enderta F.C. players
Ethiopian Premier League players
2013 Africa Cup of Nations players
Ethiopia A' international footballers